The Mumuye languages are a group of Adamawa languages spoken in Taraba State, eastern Nigeria.

Languages
The classification below follows Shimizu (1979).

Mumuye
Mumuye proper: Northeast Mumuye, Southwest Mumuye
Rang Mumuye: Rang
Pangseng Mumuye: Pangseng, Komo, Jega, etc.

Mumuye is the most widely spoken Adamawa language.

Names and locations
Below is a list of language names, populations, and locations from Blench (2019).

See also
Proto-Mumuye reconstructions (Wiktionary)

References

Shimizu, Kiyoshi. 1979. A comparative study of the Mumuye dialects (Nigeria). (Marburger Studien zur Afrika- und Asienkunde A14). Berlin: Dietrich Reimer.

 
Leko–Nimbari languages